The 2018 Harvard Crimson football team represented Harvard University during the 2018 NCAA Division I FCS football season as a member of the Ivy League. They were led by 25th-year head coach Tim Murphy and played their home games at Harvard Stadium. They finished the season 6–4 overall and 4–3 in Ivy League play to place third. Harvard averaged 13,981 fans per game during the season.

Previous season
The Crimson finished the 2017 season 5–5 overall and 3–4 in Ivy League play, to place in tie for fifth place.

Schedule
The 2018 schedule consisted of six home games and four away games. The Crimson hosted Ivy League foes Princeton, Columbia, and Yale for the 135th edition of The Game, and traveled to Brown, Cornell, Dartmouth, and Penn.

Harvard's non-conference opponents were San Diego of the Pioneer Football League, Rhode Island of the Colonial Athletic Association, and Holy Cross of the Patriot League.

Game summaries

San Diego

at Brown

Rhode Island

at Cornell

Holy Cross

Princeton

at Dartmouth

Columbia

at Penn

vs. Yale

References

Harvard
Harvard Crimson football seasons
Harvard Crimson football
Harvard Crimson football